The 1924 Louisiana Tech Bulldogs football team was an American football team that represented the Louisiana Polytechnic Institute—now known as Louisiana Tech University—as a member of the Louisiana Intercollegiate Athletic Association (LIAA) during the 1924 college football season. Led by Philip Arbuckle in his first and only year as head coach, Louisiana Tech compiled an overall record of 1–6–1. The team's captain was Otis Reed.

Schedule

References

Louisiana Tech
Louisiana Tech Bulldogs football seasons
Louisiana Tech Bulldogs football